Christmas Icetastrophe (also titled Icetastrophe) is a 2014 American made for television disaster film directed by Jonathan Winfrey. It first aired on Syfy on December 20, 2014. Victor Webster and Jennifer Spence star as survivors of a meteorite strike that causes their town to flash freeze.

Plot

A meteorite splits and one piece lands on a car in the small town of Lennox; the other piece in the mountains outside town. The town begins to progressively flash freeze, and the effect spreads outward at an alarming rate. Charlie Ratchet, a local father, teams up with Alex Novak, a graduate student who wants to study the meteorite. Together they set out to counter the effects of the freezing meteorite on their town before everything, and every one, ends up frozen. Meanwhile, Tim Ratchet, Charlie's son, goes out into the storm to find and rescue Marley Crooge, and the two fight to survive the cold to make it back to safety.

Cast
 Victor Webster as Charlie Ratchet
 Jennifer Spence as Alex Novak
 Richard Harmon as Tim Ratchet
 Tiera Skovbye as Marley Crooge
 Mike Dopud as Ben Crooge
 Johannah Newmarch as Krystal Crooge
 Andrew Francis as Scott Crooge
 Ben Cotton as Mayor Gibbons
 Boti Bliss as Faye Ratchet
 Jonathon Young as Neil
 Tyler Johnston as T.J.
 Alex Zahara as Miles
 Andrew Dunbar as Corporal Lambert
 Lane Edwards as Rob
 Jason Burkart as The Man
 Toby Levins as Cole
 John Stewart as Gary

Release 
Christmas Icetastrophe premiered December 20, 2014, on Syfy.

Reception 
Neil Genzlinger of The New York Times called it "mindlessly ridiculous" but amusing. Adam Smith of the Boston Herald rated it C+ and wrote, "Just like its title, the film is unbelievably hokey, but it's also got campy appeal that sci-fi (and Syfy) fans will find irresistible." Nancy deWolf Smith of The Wall Street Journal wrote that it "sometimes reaches a very satisfying level of scariness".

The trailer was nominated for "Trashiest Trailer" by the Golden Trailer Awards.

References

External links 
 
 

2014 science fiction films
American Christmas films
American disaster films
American science fiction television films
CineTel Films films
Disaster television films
Films about impact events
Syfy original films
2014 television films
2014 films
2010s exploitation films
2010s disaster films
2010s Christmas films
American exploitation films
Films directed by Jonathan Winfrey
2010s English-language films
2010s American films